Sláinte (also Slàinte) is a toast in Irish and Scottish Gaelic meaning "health".

Sláinte may also refer to:
Sláinte (album), an album by Mooncoyne
Slí na Sláinte, a walking initiative by the Irish heart foundation
Sláinte, former name of The BibleCode Sundays, a London Celtic rock band
Sláinte, former name of Mooncoyne, an American Celtic band